Mohammad Hassan Azad (born 7 January 1994) is an English cricketer who plays for Leicestershire. He is a left handed opening batsman and an off-break bowler.

Career
Azad began his career in the academy at Nottinghamshire. He made his first-class debut on 2 April 2015 for Loughborough MCCU against Hampshire.

Having performed well for the second XI during 2018, in March 2019 Azad signed for Leicestershire County Cricket Club ahead of the 2019 County Championship. He played in Leicestershire's match against Loughborough MCCU, in the Marylebone Cricket Club University fixtures, scoring his maiden first-class century. His good form continued through the first half of the County Championship season, and he was voted PCA Player of the Month for June. In August 2019, his performances were further rewarded when he was offered a further two-year contract.

References

External links
 

1994 births
Living people
English cricketers
Leicestershire cricketers
Lincolnshire cricketers
Loughborough MCCU cricketers
Cricketers from Quetta
Pakistani emigrants to the United Kingdom
British Asian cricketers
British sportspeople of Pakistani descent